Kedar Pandey (14 June 1920 – 3 July 1982) was an Indian freedom fighter and Indian National Congress politician, who remained the Chief Minister of Bihar from March 1972 to 2 July 1973 and Minister of Railways in the Union Cabinet from 12 November 1980 to 14 January 1982 in the Government of India.

Personal life

His father's name was the late Pandit Ramphal Panday. He was born at Taulaha Village, West Champaran District on June 14, 1920. His early schooling took place in Paroraha village along with Vikas Mishra. Later on, both were imprisoned during the Indian freedom movement.

He married Smt. Kamla Panday on June 6, 1948. He was the father of two sons, including Dr. Manoj Pandey, and two daughters. He did M.Sc. and LL.B from Banaras Hindu University.  By profession, he was an agriculturist as well as a political worker and advocate. He practised in the District Courts of Motihari and Bettiah from 1945 to 1948. He also enrolled as an advocate in the Patna High Court in 1949.

Freedom Movement 

Before independence, he participated in the Freedom Movement in 1942. Pandey was a part of the famous Young Turks of Bihar Congress during the independence movement along with Bindeshwari Dubey, Bhagwat Jha Azad, Chandrashekhar Singh, Satyendra Narayan Sinha, Abdul Ghafoor all future chief ministers and Sitaram Kesri, future national president of Indian National Congress. He participated in the Trade Union Movement from 1946 to 1957.

Political career

In the first general ekections held in 1957, he contested the Bagaha legislative constituency of the Bihar Vidhan Sabha and won. He served as Deputy Minister of Home Affairs, Police, Irrigation & Power among other portfolios from 1957 to 1962. He was again elected to the Bihar Vidhan Sabha in the Nautan constituency, serving from 1967 to 1977 holding ministerial portfolios such as Industry and Agriculture. He was the Health Minister of Bihar from 27 September 1973 to 11 April 1975 in the Abdul Gafoor cabinet.

He was imprisoned for eleven months, courted arrest three times during 1977-79, when Indira Gandhi was arrested.  Post-Emergency, he was named Bihar Pradesh Congress Committee President in 1977.  He was Vice-Chairman of Bihar Indian National Trade Union Congress. He was Chief Minister of Bihar from March 1972 to 2 July 1973.

In 1980 Congress (I) provided a ticket from Bettiah and he became a member of parliament Lok Sabha. He was Minister of Railways as well as Ministry of Rural Development from 12 November 1980 to 14 January 1982.

References

1920 births
1982 deaths
Chief Ministers of Bihar
Bihar MLAs 1957–1962
Bihar MLAs 1969–1972
Bihar MLAs 1952–1957
Bihar MLAs 1972–1977
Bihar MLAs 1977–1980
India MPs 1980–1984
Railway Ministers of India
Banaras Hindu University alumni
Indian National Congress politicians from Bihar
Lok Sabha members from Bihar
Chief ministers from Indian National Congress